Göda, in Sorbian Hodźij, is a municipality in the east of Saxony, Germany. It belongs to the district of Bautzen and lies west of the eponymous city.

The municipality is part of the recognized Sorbian settlement area in Saxony. Upper Sorbian has an official status next to German, all settlements bear names in both languages.

Geography 
The municipality is located within the hills of Upper Lusatia.

Villages 
Several villages belong to the municipality:

Coblenz (Koblicy) with Coblenz, Dobranitz (Dobranecy), Kleinpraga (Mała Praha), Nedaschütz (Njezdašecy), Pietzschwitz (Běčicy) and Zischkowitz (Čěškecy);
Göda (Hodźij);
Göda surroundings with Birkau (Brěza), Buscheritz (Bóšericy), Dahren (Darin), Döbschke (Debiškow), Jannowitz (Janecy) and Semmichau (Zemichow);
Kleinförstchen (Mała Boršć) with Dreistern (Tři Hwězdy), Kleinförstchen, Neu-Bloaschütz (Nowe Błohašecy), Oberförstchen (Hornja Boršć), Preske (Praskow) and Siebitz (Dźiwoćicy);
Prischwitz (Prěčecy) with Dreikretscham (Haslow), Liebon (Liboń), Muschelwitz (Myšecy), Paßditz (Pozdecy), Prischwitz, Sollschwitz (Sulšecy), Storcha (Baćoń) and Zscharnitz (Čornecy);
Seitschen (Žičeń) with Kleinseitschen (Žičeńk) and Seitschen;
Spittwitz (Spytecy) with Leutwitz (Lutyjecy), Neuspittwitz (Nowe Spytecy) and Spittwitz.

References 

Populated places in Bautzen (district)